The House of Inju (Injuids, Injus, or Inju'ids) was an Iranian dynasty of Persian origin that came to rule over the cities of Shiraz and Isfahan during the 14th century. Its members became de facto independent rulers following the breakup of the Ilkhanate until their defeat in 1357.

Before the breakup of the Ilkhanate
The Injuids gained control of parts of Iran, mostly Fars, in 1304 at the beginning of the reign of the Ilkhan Öljeitü. The Ilkhan had given Sharaf al-Din Mahmud Shah control of the injü (or inji; the Mongol word for the royal estates). Sharaf al-Din was reportedly descended from 'Abd-Allah Ansari, an 11th-century mystic of Herat. His son, Amir Ghiyas al-Din Kai-Khusrau, assisted another family, the Muzaffarids, in their takeover of Yazd. By 1325 Sharaf al-Din had gained nearly an absolute grip on the region. His power displeased Öljeitü's successor Abu Sa'id, who ordered Sharaf al-Din removed and sent a Sheikh Hussein ibn Juban to replace him. Kai-Khusrau, who ruled Shiraz for his father, resisted; and Sheikh Hussein was forced to return with an Ilkhan army. Also during Abu Sa'id's lifetime, Sharaf al-Din was imprisoned in Tabriz for a failed attempt to murder his successor.

Independence

With the death of Abu Sa'id in 1335, Arpa Ke'un took the throne. He had Sharaf al-Din executed; two  of Sharaf's sons in the royal encampment (Amir Jalal al-Din Mas'ud Shah, who fled to Hasan Buzurg; Shaikh Abu Ishaq to Amir 'Ali Padishah) withdrew from the scene. Meanwhile, Kai-Khusrau was asserting his authority in Shiraz. When Arpa Ke'un was captured by rebels, he was sent to Mas'ud Shah, who killed him. Mas'ud Shah then served as vizier under the Jalayirid puppet Ilkhan Muhammed Khan; when the latter was killed, he made his way to Shiraz. The two brothers came into conflict, which was only settled when Kai-Khusrau's died (1338/9).

Mas'ud Shah was quickly faced with more challenges to his reign. A year after Kai Khusrau's death, a fourth son of Sharaf al-Din named Shams al-Din Muhammad escaped from his brother's prison of Qal'a-yi Saf'id, whereupon he joined the Chobanids. Shams al-Din, together with the Chobanid Pir Hosayn, marched to Shiraz, which they captured. Mas'ud Shah fled to Luristan. Pir Hosayn, however, murdered Shams al-Din; this act lost him support in the city, and he had to withdraw. Pir Hosayn reconquered the city in the next year, however. Mas'ud Shah attempted to take advantage of Chobanid infighting, and allied with Yagi Basti to take the city, which had in the meantime fallen into the hands of Abu Ishaq. He had been given Isfahan by Pir Hosayn, and he now took Shiraz as well. When Yagi Basti murdered Mas'ud Shah that same year, Abu Ishaq became the sole surviving son of Sharaf al-Din. He took Shiraz from Yagi Basti in March 1343.

Fall of the Injuids under Abu Ishaq

Jamal al-Din Abu Ishaq's goal was to conquer Kerman; he therefore undertook expeditions against the Muzaffarids, who were led by Mubariz al-Din Muhammad. The rivalry between the two heated up during a campaign against the Muzaffarid city of Yazd during 1350 and 1351. In retaliation, Mubariz al-Din invaded Fars in 1352. After defeating the Injuids in battle, he laid siege to Shiraz in 1353. Abu Ishaq, who grew increasingly paranoid, ordered the extermination of two quarters of the city in order to root out traitors. The chief of another quarter, fearing for his people, gave the key for his gate to Mubariz al-Din's son Shah Shuja. Abu Ishaq was forced to surrender, but he escaped and made his way to Isfahan with the support of the Jalayirids. Mubariz al-Din, however, laid siege to that city also, and captured it in 1357. Abu Ishaq again surrendered, was sent to Shiraz, and was executed. The Injuid lands now fell into the hands of the Muzaffarids, who would hold them until the onslaught of Timur forty years later.

Injuid rulers

 Sharaf al-Din Mahmud Shah (1304–1325)
 Amir Ghiyas al-Din Kai-Khusrau (1336–1338/9)
 Amir Jalal al-Din Mas'ud Shah (in opposition to Kai-Khusrau)
 Shams al-Din Muhammad (in opposition to Mas'ud Shah) (1339)
 Shaikh Jamal al-Din Abu Ishaq

References

Sources
 
Peter Jackson (1986). The Cambridge History of Iran, Volume Six: The Timurid and Safavid Periods. 
Arthur J. Arberrt (1960). Shiraz: Persian City of Saints and Poets.

External links

14th century in Iran
States and territories established in 1335
States and territories disestablished in 1357
Former countries in the Middle East